Stratton Mountain is a resort community and census-designated place (CDP) in Bennington and Windham counties, Vermont, United States. Sitting at the northern foot of Stratton Mountain and its ski resort, it was first listed as a CDP prior to the 2020 census.

The southern half of the community, including the base of the ski area, is in the town of Stratton in Windham County, while the northern half, including the Stratton Golf Course, is in the town of Winhall in Bennington County. Stratton Mountain Access Road leads north  to Vermont Route 30 in Bondville, while to the southeast Pikes Falls Road leads  to Route 30 in the village of Jamaica.

References 

Populated places in Bennington County, Vermont
Census-designated places in Bennington County, Vermont
Populated places in Windham County, Vermont
Census-designated places in Windham County, Vermont
Census-designated places in Vermont